This is a non-exhaustive list of Morocco women's international footballers – association football players who have appeared at least once for the senior Morocco women's national football team.

Players

See also 
 Morocco women's national football team

References
Notes

Citations

 
Association football player non-biographical articles
Morocco